The 1903 Tie Cup Final was the final match to decide the winner of the Tie Cup, the 4th. edition of the international competition organised by Argentine and Uruguayan Associations together. As its previous editions, the final was contested by two teams from Argentina, Alumni (third consecutive final contested) and Rosario A.C. (fourth consecutive final). 

The match, held in Sociedad Sportiva Argentina stadium, was won by Alumni 3–2 after extra time, winning its 2nd. title in this competition.

Qualified teams

Overview 

The cup was contested by nine teams, with five playing in the Argentine Primera División, two from Rosarian League and two playing in Uruguayan league. Flores could not register in the tournament while Estudiantes (BA) declined to participate. 

In the first round, Alumni achieved a large victory over arch-rival Belgrano A.C. (6–1) at Quilmes stadium while Rosario A.C. had thrashed Rosario Central 5–0 in Plaza Jewell. In semifinals, Alumni defeated Club Nacional de Football (1–0 at Parque Central) while Rosario A.C. beat Quilmes 2–0 in Plaza Jewell.

Although Rosario A.C. did not win the Cup, the club was in the road to consolidate not only as the main team in its city of origin but one of the strongest teams in Argentina, with four consecutive international finals played. Nevertheless, the club would abandon the practise of football in the 1910s, focusing on rugby union and field hockey.

Match details

References

August 1903 sports events
Football in Buenos Aires
T
T
t
t